Against All Odds: Zambia's President Edgar Chagwa Lungu's Rough Journey to State House is a biography of Zambia's President Edgar Lungu by the Zambian journalist and senior diplomat Anthony Mukwita, published by Partridge Africa on 5 January 2017.

The book, written by Zambia's former Deputy Ambassador to Sweden and former Ambassador to Germany, set many records when it became the first Zambian book to go on sale at Barnes & Noble and the first Zambian book on a head of state to be featured in the London Book Fair in Hammersmith.

Mukwita previously worked as Editor-in-Chief of the Daily Mail, Zambia's largest daily circulation newspaper, and was a World Bank winner for Best Investigative Journalism in 2012.

Overview
 
Against All Odds is written by a first-time writer about Zambia's President Edgar Lungu and his path from an unassuming lawyer and minister to the president of one of the world's leading copper-producing countries.

Editions
 First, 2017. Partridge Africa . 
 Paperback, 2017. Partridge Africa. (174 pages)
 Hardback, 2017. Partridge Africa. (174 pages)

References

Works by Anthony Mukwita
2017 non-fiction books